Pinmonkey is a self-titled album released by the American country music group Pinmonkey. It was issued in late 2002 on BNA Records. The album peaked at number 17 on the Top Country Albums charts and produced two Top 40 country singles: "Barbed Wire and Roses" and "I Drove All Night". It is also their only major-label release.

Content
"Barbed Wire and Roses" was the first release from Pinmonkey. In late 2002, this song reached a peak of number 25 on the Billboard country charts. Following this song was the only other single release from the album, a cover of Cyndi Lauper's "I Drove All Night". Pinmonkey's cover peaked at number 36 on the country charts and was their final Top 40 country hit. Also covered on this album is "Fly", originally recorded by Sugar Ray. The song "Augusta" was previously included on Pinmonkey's 2002 independent release Speak No Evil.  Dolly Parton provided harmony vocals on their cover of her 1976 composition "Falling Out of Love With Me".

After this song, the band released a cover of Robbie Fulks' "Let's Kill Saturday Night", but after this song failed to make Top 40, the band exited BNA's roster. They would not release another album until 2006's Big Shiny Cars.

Track listing
"Slow Train' Comin'" (Ashley Gorley, Melissa Peirce, Bryan Simpson) – 3:49
"Jar of Clay" (Michael Reynolds) – 2:50
"Every Time It Rains" (Leslie Satcher, Bobby Carmichael) – 3:50
"Augusta" (Gwil Owen) – 4:54
"Fly" (Sugar Ray) – 3:20
"Falling Down" (Jeff Skorik) – 3:38
"The Longest Road" (Reynolds) – 4:12
"Falling Out of Love with Me" (Dolly Parton) – 3:44
"Barbed Wire and Roses" (Tia Sillers, Mark Selby, Sean Locke) – 3:15
"I Drove All Night" (Tom Kelly, Billy Steinberg) – 3:29
"Stay with Us" (Mavis Staples) – 3:20

Personnel

Pinmonkey
Chad Jeffers – Dobro, lap steel guitar, banjo, acoustic guitar, background vocals
Michael Jeffers – bass guitar
Michael Reynolds – lead vocals, acoustic guitar
Rick Schell – drums, percussion, acoustic guitar, background vocals

Additional musicians
Bob Britt – acoustic guitar, electric guitar, 12-string electric guitar
Al Perkins — electric guitar on "The Longest Road"
Ricky Skaggs – mandolin on "Augusta"
Bryan Sutton – acoustic guitar and mandolin on "Slow Train Comin'"
Michael Webb – Hammond B-3 organ, electric piano, Farfisa organ, Wurlitzer
Paul Worley — acoustic guitar, electric guitar
Rusty Young – banjo and mandolin on "Slow Train Comin'"

Technical
 Carlos Grier - digital editing
 Erik Hellerman - recording
 Andrew Mendelson - digital editing
 Mike Poole - production, recording, mixing
 Denny Purcell - mastering
 Clarke Schleicher - recording
 Paul Worley - production

Chart performance

References

2002 albums
BNA Records albums
Pinmonkey albums
Albums produced by Paul Worley